Maduro Holding B.V. is the holding company of the Maduro Group, a Dutch Caribbean business with interests in shipping services, logistics, and real estate.

History

S.E.L. Maduro was founded in 1837 as a trading company between local Caribbean ports. Following the opening of the Panama Canal and the discovery of oil in the nearby Maracaibo Basin, the port of Willemstad became a regional energy hub. During World War II, Willemstad's port was the primary supplier of fuel to the Royal Air Force during the North African Campaign and it remains an important refining center.

In 1916, Maduro and local financier Joseph Alvarez-Correa founded Maduro's Bank, the predecessor to Maduro & Curiel's Bank.

External links
Maduro Shipping Group 
Maduro Travel 
Maduro Travel Aruba

References

Holding companies of Curaçao